Mohamed Said Abdel Wehab (born 12 January 1954) is an Egyptian boxer. He competed in the 1976 Summer Olympics.

References

External links
 

1954 births
Living people
Boxers at the 1976 Summer Olympics
Egyptian male boxers
Olympic boxers of Egypt
Light-flyweight boxers
20th-century Egyptian people